Charleswood—St. James—Assiniboia—Headingley (formerly known as Charleswood—Assiniboine and Charleswood—St. James—Assiniboia) is a federal electoral district in Manitoba, Canada, that has been represented in the House of Commons of Canada since 1997.

Demographics
According to the 2021 Canadian census

Ethnic groups: 75.4% White, 11.3% Indigenous, 4.2% Filipino, 2.4% South Asian, 2.1% Black, 1.1% Chinese
Languages: 83% English, 2.1% Tagalog, 1.5% French, 1.3% German, 1.1 Russian
Religions (2021): 52.2% Christian (19.1% Catholic, 7.9% United Church, 4.8% Anglican, 2.9% Lutheran, 1.6% Christian Orthodox, 1.3% Anabaptist, 1.2% Baptist), 42.6% No religion, 1.3% Muslim, 1.2% Jewish, 1% Sikh 
Median income (2020): $46,000 
Average income (2020): $57,050

History
In 1996, it was created as "Charleswood—Assiniboine" from Winnipeg—St. James riding.

In 1998, it was renamed "Charleswood—St. James—Assiniboia".

In 2003, it was abolished, but the entire district was transferred to "Charleswood—St. James", and small parts of Winnipeg Centre and Winnipeg South Centre were added.

In 2004, it was renamed "Charleswood—St. James—Assiniboia".

In 2015, it was renamed Charleswood—St. James—Assiniboia—Headingley but there was no boundary changes following the 2012 Canadian federal electoral redistribution.

Members of Parliament

Current Member of Parliament
Its Member of Parliament is Marty Morantz. He was first elected in 2019. He is a member of the Conservative Party of Canada

Election results

Charleswood—St. James—Assiniboia—Headingley, 2015–present

Charleswood—St. James—Assiniboia, 2004–2015

Charleswood—St. James, 2003–2004

Note: Conservative vote is compared to the total of the Canadian Alliance vote and Progressive Conservative vote in 2000 election.

Charleswood St. James—Assiniboia, 1998–2003

Note: Canadian Alliance vote is compared to the Reform vote in 1997 election.

Charleswood—Assiniboine, 1996–1998

See also
 List of Canadian federal electoral districts
 Past Canadian electoral districts

References

 
 
 
 
 Expenditures - 2008
Expenditures - 2004
Expenditures - 2000
Expenditures - 1997

Notes

Manitoba federal electoral districts
Politics of Winnipeg
Charleswood, Winnipeg
Assiniboia, Winnipeg
St. James, Winnipeg
Headingley, Manitoba